Ann Hallenberg (born 17 March 1967) is a Swedish mezzo-soprano. She has a busy career on the stage and concert platform around Europe embracing roles by Rossini, Mozart, Gluck, Handel, Vivaldi, Monteverdi, and Purcell.

Hallenberg studied at the Royal College of Music, Stockholm, with Kerstin Meyer and Erik Saedén; she undertook further study in London with Joy Mammen. Early roles included Fulgenzia in Il fortunato inganno by Donizetti at the Vadstena Academy in 1995 and Aristaeus in Rossi's Orfeo in Drottningholm in 1997, returning in 2001 as Cornelia in Giulio Cesare.

The mezzo-soprano was made artist in residence at Drottningholm for 2019 and 2020, and decided on the repertoire; in the first year it was Ariodante conducted by Ian Page.

Recordings
 Carnevale 1729. Ann Hallenberg, Stefano Montanari, Il Pomo d'Oro. PENTATONE PTC 5186678 (2017). 
 Recital – Arias for Marietta Marcolini, Rossini's first muse, Stavanger Symphony Orchestra, Fabio Biondi 
 Brahms Alto Rhapsody. Philippe Herreweghe, Phi.
 Franz Waxman, Joshua. James Sedares, DG.
 Vivaldi Il Farnace, Diego Fasolis, Virgin Classics.
 Vivaldi Orlando furioso, Christophe Spinosi, Naive.
 Handel Imeneo, Capella Augustina, Andreas Spering. cpo 2002
 Handel Tolomeo, Alan Curtis, DG.

DVD
 Handel Ariodante Il Complesso Barocco, Alan Curtis
 Handel Serse

References

External links
 Ann Hallenberg at Artefact Artists
 Ann Hallenberg (Mezzo-soprano) at Bach Cantatas Website

1967 births
Living people
Swedish operatic mezzo-sopranos
21st-century Swedish women opera singers
Women performers of early music
Royal College of Music, Stockholm alumni
20th-century Swedish women opera singers